Alster  is a tributary of the Elbe river in Northern Germany.

Alster may also refer to:

Alster (Itz), a river of Bavaria and Thuringia, Germany, tributary of the Itz
Alster, Sweden, a locality in Värmland County, Sweden
Der Club an der Alster, a German sports club in Hamburg
German auxiliary Alster (A50) (1988), an intelligence ship of the German Navy
Mathilda Alster, a fictitious character in the Japanese manga Beyblade
a Shandy with lemonade called Alster in northern Germany
SS Alster, a number of steamships